The ‘Ene’io Botanical Garden (EBG) is a botanical garden in Tonga and is the first of its kind there. It has the largest and most varied plant collection in the Kingdom of Tonga.

The botanical garden is located in Vava'u, 10 minutes from Neiafu. As an agronomist with 38 years of agricultural experience (18 as the Director of Agriculture and Food within the Tongan government), Fa’anunu offers visitors a personalized tour through gardens containing over 100 plant families and 500 plant species, both native and exotic. The garden also has ocean access at ‘Ene’io Beach, a private beach with a camping area.

The garden opened to the public in 2006, and also acts as an unofficial bird sanctuary.

References

External links 

 Informative brochure

Eneio Botanical Garden
Vavaʻu